The 2013 Clipsal 500 Adelaide was a motor race for V8 Supercars held on 2 and 3 March 2013. The event was held at the Adelaide Street Circuit in Adelaide, South Australia, and consisted of two races of two hundred and fifty kilometres in length. It was the first round of the 2013 International V8 Supercars Championship, and marked the racing debuts of the Holden VF Commodore, Mercedes-Benz E63 AMG, and Nissan Altima L33, all of which were entered in the series under the brand-new "Car of the Future" regulations; Ford continued to use the FG Falcon model raced in previous years, but built to Car of the Future specifications.

Report

Race 1

Qualifying

Notes:
 — Craig Lowndes and Shane van Gisbergen both set lap times that were identical to the ten-thousandth of a second. As Lowndes had set his laptime before Van Gisbergen, he was awarded provisional pole.

Top 10 Shootout

Race

Race 2

Qualifying

Race

Championship standings after the race

Drivers' Championship standings

Teams' Championship standings

 Note: Only the top five positions are included for both sets of standings.

References

Adelaide 500
Clipsal 500
Motorsport in Adelaide
Sports competitions in Adelaide
March 2013 sports events in Australia
2010s in Adelaide